Deißlingen is a municipality of the district of Rottweil of Baden-Württemberg, Germany.

History
In 1802-03, Deißlingen, a possession of the Free Imperial City of Rottweil, and Lauffen ob Rottweil, a property of Rottenmünster Abbey, were mediatized to the Electorate, later Kingdom, of Württemberg. Lauffen joined Deißlingen in Rottweil's jurisdiction on 27 October 1810. The district was reorganized on 1 October 1938 as Landkreis Rottweil, to which the two towns were still assigned. On 1 January 1974, Lauffen was incorporated into Deißlingen and a new municipality formed.

Geography
Elevation above sea level in the municipal area ranges from a high of  Normalnull (NN) at the border with Tuttlingen district to a low of  NN on the Neckar as it forms the border with Rottweil.

The forested slopes of the Neckar and Mückenbach river valleys were declared  in 1953.

Politics
Deißlingen has two boroughs (Ortsteile): Deißlingen and Lauffen.

Coat of arms
The municipal coat of arms for Deißlingen shows a blue wolfsangel upon a field of yellow, with a black bar at the top containing a yellow stag antler, a clear reference to Württemberg. The wall anchor is a motif associated with Lauffen ob Rottweil's as early as 1780. This coat of arms is a combination of those of the towns of Deißlingen and Lauffen, with a change made to the chief to comply with the rule of tincture. The Rottweil district office approved the official use of the coat of arms and issued a corresponding municipal flag on 10 December 1981.

References

External links
  (in German)

Rottweil (district)
Populated places on the Neckar basin
Populated riverside places in Germany